Sergio Giordani (born 10 May 1953) is an Italian politician and entrepreneur. He is the current mayor of Padua, in office since 28 June 2017.

Biography

Entrepreneurial career 
He graduated as a technical expert. In the 1986–1987 season he joined the Board of Directors of Calcio Padova as a managing director. In 1990 he became vice president while in 1994 with the landing in Serie A he became president until 1996. He has held positions in the Padua Chamber of Commerce in PadovaFiere S.p.A. and at the Padua Civil Airport. He was the president of Calcio Padova from 1994 to 1996.

Personal life 
Giordani is married to Lucia and has two children.

References

External links 
 
 Sergio Giordani at saichivoti.it

|-

1953 births
Living people
Italian businesspeople
21st-century Italian politicians
20th-century Italian politicians
Mayors of Padua